Collinsia heterophylla, known as purple Chinese houses or innocence, is a flowering plant native to California and the Peninsular Ranges in northern Baja California.

Description
Collinsia heterophylla is an annual plant growing in shady places,   in height.

It blooms from mid spring to early summer. Like other species in the genus Collinsia, which also includes the blue-eyed Marys, it gets its name from its towers of inflorescences of decreasing diameter, which give the plants in full flower a certain resemblance to a pagoda.

Dried in air, the seeds weigh about 1 mg each.

Varieties
Collinsia heterophylla var. austromontana
Collinsia heterophylla var. heterophylla

Taxonomy
The species was first described as Collinsia bicolor by George Bentham in 1835, but this name proved to be a later homonym of Collinsia bicolor Raf. (described in 1824), necessitating the name change to C. heterophylla. Despite this, the name C. bicolor is still sometimes used in references.

Gallery

References

External links
 Jepson Manual treatment of Collinsia heterophylla
 Collinsia heterophylla — photographs from the CalPhotos archive

heterophylla
Flora without expected TNC conservation status
Flora of California
Flora of Baja California
Flora of the Cascade Range
Flora of the Klamath Mountains
Flora of the Sierra Nevada (United States)
Natural history of the California chaparral and woodlands
Natural history of the California Coast Ranges
Natural history of the Central Valley (California)
Natural history of the Channel Islands of California
Natural history of the Peninsular Ranges
Natural history of the San Francisco Bay Area
Natural history of the Santa Monica Mountains
Natural history of the Transverse Ranges
Plants described in 1838